Daichi Miyata (born July 14, 1996) is a Japanese former figure skater. He won the bronze medal at the 2015–16 Japan Junior Championships and was selected to compete at the 2016 World Junior Championships in Debrecen. In Hungary, he qualified for the final segment in 19th place and finished 18th overall.

Programs

Competitive highlights 
CS: Challenger Series; JGP: Junior Grand Prix

References

External links 
 

1996 births
Japanese male single skaters
Living people
People from Ōnojō
Sportspeople from Fukuoka Prefecture